Keissleriella is a genus of fungi in the Massarinaceae family. The genus was circumscribed by Franz Xaver Rudolf von Höhnel in 1919.

Species
Keissleriella aesculi
Keissleriella caudata
Keissleriella cladophila
Keissleriella culmifida
Keissleriella gallica
Keissleriella genistae
Keissleriella ocellata
Keissleriella pinicola
Keissleriella rara
Keissleriella sambucina
Keissleriella subalpina
Keissleriella taminensis

References

Pleosporales
Taxa named by Franz Xaver Rudolf von Höhnel
Taxa described in 1919